Nandita Chandra is a multiple award-winning actress and model.

She has featured widely on the international stage and in independent films. In addition to acting, Chandra is an acclaimed children's theatre director and a former television anchor for Channel V India. She is also the first Indian woman to be accepted into the Acting program (MFA) at the Actors Studio Drama School in New York.

In 2003 she received critical acclaim for her performance in the play Edible Women and Anastasia. In March 2008 she was felicitated by Himachal Pradesh C.M. Hon Pratibha Singh for her contribution in the field of theatre and performing arts in India.

She is a company member of the Off Broadway Irish Repertory Theatre. She currently lives and works in New York. She was last seen in The Homebase Project in David Bar Katz's "Can't Go Home" opposite LAByrinth founding member David Deblinger. She was featured in a Yashraj films production with Bollywood leading man Shahid Kapoor. In 2010 she starred in "The Blowup" by J Wingfield which premiered at The Manhattan Film Festival.
 
Her TV credits include I Love You…But I Lied (LMN), The Leftovers (HBO), Taxi Brooklyn (NBC), White Collar (USA), and Curb Appeal (HGTV).

In September 2011, she won the Outstanding Actress award at The Midtown International Theater Festival in NYC for her one-woman show I-Pod, written by Natalie Menna and directed by Joan Kane. I-Pod is the story of a glamorous New York City artist who pretends to be an environmentalist to win a Guggenheim grant. The awards ceremony took place at New World Stages in New York. 
In March 2012 I-Pod won Best Solo Show at The Network One Act Festival (directed by Sarah Paige).

Filmography
Chehere (2003) Mrs Fernandez
Red, Black and White (2003) Yasmin
Red Earth (2004) Katsaki
Occasional Twists and Turns (2004) Shashi
Going Up (2007)

TV credits
White Collar (2009)
The Leftovers (2014)
I Love You... But I Lied (2015)
Falling Water (2016)

References

External links
http://www.midtownfestival.org/

Indian stage actresses
Female models from Delhi
Place of birth missing (living people)
Year of birth missing (living people)
Indian film actresses
Delhi University alumni
Living people